Amanda Ellis is a diplomat from New Zealand and at Arizona State University. She leads Global Partnerships for the Julie Ann Wrigley Global Futures Laboratory and co-chairs WE Empower United Nations Sustainable Development Goal (SDG) Challenge.

Education
For executive education, Ellis attended INSEAD, Stanford Graduate School of Business, Harvard Kennedy School  and Harvard Business School. From the University of Hawaiʻi at Mānoa, she earned a MA in communication and political science. Her BA is from the University of Otago with degrees in French and Economics and her MBA is from Australian Graduate School of Management.

References

Permanent Representatives of New Zealand to the United Nations
New Zealand women ambassadors
Arizona State University people
INSEAD alumni
Stanford Graduate School of Business alumni
Harvard Business School alumni
Harvard Kennedy School alumni
University of Otago alumni
University of Hawaiʻi at Mānoa alumni
Year of birth missing (living people)
Living people